Lucas Damián Pruzzo (born 6 July 1994) is an Argentine footballer who plays for Deportivo Madryn.

References

Argentine footballers
1994 births
Living people
Unión de Santa Fe footballers
Guillermo Brown footballers
Unión de Sunchales footballers
Deportivo Armenio footballers
Deportivo Madryn players
Primera Nacional players
Torneo Federal A players
Argentine Primera División players
Association football defenders
Sportspeople from Entre Ríos Province